Kerr Kriisa (born 2 January 2001) is an Estonian college basketball player for the Arizona Wildcats of the Pac-12 Conference. A native of Tartu, he has competed with Estonian junior national teams on multiple occasions.

Early career

2016–2018: Early years
Kriisa played for the youth teams of his hometown club BC Tartu since he was 12 years old and debuted with University of Tartu first team during the 2016–17 KML season at the age of 15. In September 2017 he signed with Brose Bamberg and started playing in their affiliate team Baunach Young Pikes. His stint in Germany was cut short due to periostitis and he returned to Estonia for treatment.

2018–2020: Žalgiris Kaunas
In August 2018, he signed with Žalgiris Kaunas. In his first year with the Kaunas team Kriisa played on the Lithuanian second league (NKL) team Žalgiris-2 and also for the youth team in the Euroleague Basketball Next Generation Tournament. He was awarded with the MVP and All-Tournament Team honours at the Kaunas Qualifying Tournament. Kriisa averaged 17.3 points, 4.7 assists and 2.7 rebounds over 7 games ib the 2018–19 season of Next Generation Tournament.

Kriisa made his EuroLeague debut for Žalgiris on 25 October 2019 and scored his first point from a free throw as Žalgiris defeated LDLC ASVEL 70–56 in the Regular Season Round 4 game. In November 2019 Kriisa was sent on loan to another Lithuanian team CBet Prienai to gain experience in the Lithuanian Basketball League (LKL). His loan spell ended in January 2020 and Kriisa returned to Žalgiris-2.

College career

2020–present: Arizona Wildcats
On April 18, 2020, Kriisa committed to play college basketball in the United States for Arizona. Analysts considered him to be the best European recruit considering playing at the collegiate level. After head coach Sean Miller was fired, he entered the transfer portal while leaving the option of returning to Arizona open. New head coach Tommy Lloyd was able to recruit him back to Arizona for his sophomore season.

National team career
Kriisa has represented the Estonia national U-16 team at the 2016 and 2017 FIBA Europe Under-16 Championships and the Estonia national U-18 team at the 2019 FIBA Europe Under-18 Division B Championship.

Career statistics

EuroLeague

|-
| style="text-align:left;"| 2019–20
| style="text-align:left;"| Žalgiris Kaunas
| 1 || 0 || 2.1 || .000 || .000 || .500 || .0 || .0 || .0 || .0 || 1.0 || .0
|- class="sortbottom"
| style="text-align:center;" colspan="2"| Career
| 1 || 0 || 2.1 || .000 || .000 || .500 || .0 || .0 || .0 || .0 || 1.0 || .0

College

|-
| style="text-align:left;"| 2020–21
| style="text-align:left;"| Arizona
| 8 || 5 || 22.9 || .333 || .368 || 1.000 || .5 || 2.4 || .4 || .0 || 5.5
|-
| style="text-align:left;"| 2021–22
| style="text-align:left;"| Arizona
| 33 || 31 || 29.6 || .348 || .336 || .816 || 2.5 || 4.7 || .6 || .1  || 9.7
|- class="sortbottom"
| style="text-align:center;" colspan="2"| Career
| 41 || 36 || 28.2 || .347 || .341 || .824 || 2.1 || 4.2 || .5 || .1 || 8.9

Personal life
Kerr is the son of former Estonia international Valmo Kriisa. He is named after Steve Kerr, who also played basketball at the University of Arizona.

References

External links
Arizona Wildcats bio

2001 births
Living people
BC Žalgiris players
Estonian men's basketball players
Sportspeople from Tartu
Point guards
Estonian expatriate basketball people in Germany
Estonian expatriate basketball people in Lithuania
Estonian expatriate basketball people in the United States